The Frontkämpferprivileg (front-line fighter's privilege) was an exemption granted by the government of Nazi Germany between 1933 and 1935 to German Jews who had fought for Germany during the First World War but faced dismissal from official posts under anti-Jewish legislation in prewar Nazi Germany. 

The "Law for the Restoration of the Professional Civil Service" of 7 April 1933 aimed to force all "non-Aryans" to retire from the legal profession and civil service, and other anti-Jewish laws passed in 1933 sought to drive Jews out of other areas of public life. These moves prompted a protest from Captain Leo Löwenstein, the president of the Reich Association of Jewish Frontline Soldiers, who wrote to the Nazi leader Adolf Hitler to complain. He pointed out that of Germany's half-million Jewish population, 96,000 had served in the war and 12,000 had perished. He wrote:

It also met with the disapproval of Reich President Paul von Hindenburg, a former First World War Field Marshal, who wrote in a letter to Hitler:

Hindenburg insisted that Jewish former front-line soldiers and their sons must be allowed to continue in their jobs. The law of 7 April 1933 thus included a clause that exempted such people, creating the so-called Frontkämpferprivileg (front-line fighter privilege). To the surprise of the Nazis, nearly 50 per cent of the Jewish officials who faced dismissal were able to prove that they fell into this category. However, the privilege was abolished after Hindenburg's death when the Nuremberg Laws of 1935 instituted systematic discrimination against Jews and deprived them of citizenship.

References

1933 in Germany
1933 in law
Civil services
The Holocaust in Germany
Holocaust racial laws
Law in Nazi Germany
Jewish German history
Repealed German legislation